Atakule is a 125 m (410 feet) high communications and observation tower located in the Çankaya district of central Ankara, Turkey, and is one of the primary landmarks of the city. As the district of Çankaya is itself on a hill, the tower can be spotted from almost anywhere in the city during clear days. The tower's design came from architect Ragıp Buluç and the construction works lasted from 1987 to 1989. The top section of the tower houses an open terrace and a revolving restaurant named Sevilla, which makes a 360 degree rotation in one hour. On top of Sevilla is another restaurant, Dome, which is non-revolving and located directly under the cupola. Under the terrace is a café, named UFO. The bottom structures house a shopping mall and several indoor and outdoor restaurants. The tower was opened on 13 October 1989 by President Turgut Özal. Due to the ongoing rebuilding of the shopping mall, the tower is now closed to visitors. This tower is very similar to Milad Tower in the capital of Iran.

In Turkish, the word ata means "ancestor" (or "father" in Old Turkic), which is often used as a nickname (Ata) for Mustafa Kemal Atatürk, the founder and first President of the Republic of Turkey; while the Turkish word kule means "tower".

Atrium shopping mall 

The shopping mall adjacent to the tower, Atrium, was also opened on 13 October 1989. It was the first modern mall in Ankara and the second in Turkey after Galleria in Istanbul, which was opened in 1987. The shopping mall was closed due to loss of popularity in the face of competition from an increasing number of more modern shopping malls in the city. It is now demolished and being rebuilt as a contemporary style shopping mall.

See also 
 List of tallest buildings in Ankara

References

External links 

 Official website of the Atakule Tower  

Towers completed in 1989
Towers with revolving restaurants
Buildings and structures in Ankara
Tourist attractions in Ankara
Çankaya, Ankara
Communication towers in Turkey
Observation towers in Turkey
1989 establishments in Turkey